WEC 4: Rumble Under The Sun was a mixed martial arts event held on August 31, 2002, at the Mohegan Sun Casino in Uncasville, Connecticut, USA. The main event was a fight between Aaron Brink and Jeremy Horn.

Results

See also
 World Extreme Cagefighting
 List of World Extreme Cagefighting champions
 List of WEC events
 2002 in WEC

External links
 WEC 4 results at Sherdog.com

World Extreme Cagefighting events
Events in Uncasville, Connecticut
2002 in mixed martial arts
Mixed martial arts in Connecticut
Sports in Uncasville, Connecticut
2002 in sports in Connecticut